Caiphus Semenya (born 19 August 1939) is a South African composer and musician. He was born in Alexandra, Gauteng, Johannesburg, South Africa.

He left South Africa for Los Angeles, California, United States, in the 1960s, together with his wife, singer Letta Mbulu. Among the artists with whom he worked are Hugh Masekela, Jonas Gwangwa, Hotep Galeta, Miriam Makeba, Lou Rawls, Nina Simone and Cannonball Adderley. Semenya also arranged the Swahili chant in the intro to Michael Jackson's "Liberian Girl" from the 1987 Bad album.

Awards
 2015: South African Afro Music Awards
 2015: ACT Lifetime Achievement Award for Music
 1986: Academy Award for Best Original Score for the 1985 film The Color Purple; shared the nomination with nine other composers.

Discography
The Very Best of Caiphus Semenya (Columbia, 1996)
Woman Got a Right to Be (1996)
Streams Today... Rivers Tomorrow (Munjale, 1984)	
Listen to the Wind (CBS, 1982)

With Quincy Jones
 Roots (A&M, 1977)

References

External links
Unisa honours the love story of Letta Mbulu and Caiphus Semenya 

1939 births
Living people
South African jazz composers
Musicians from Johannesburg